Sciaky, Inc. is an American manufacturer of metal 3d printing systems and industrial welding systems, founded in 1939 and headquartered in Chicago, Illinois. It specializes in electron beam welding systems and services for aerospace manufacturers.

In 2009, Sciaky entered the 3D Printing field with its electron beam additive manufacturing (EBAM) process for large metal parts and applications. In 2011, this technology was selected to produce titanium components for the F-35 Fighter Jet and, later, satellite propellant tanks. Sciaky's EBAM systems became available for commercial purchase in September 2014. Sciaky is a subsidiary of manufacturing and repair company Phillips Service Industries, Inc.

History

1930s
Sciaky Brothers, Inc. is founded in 1939.

1940s 
Sciaky is a key supplier of resistance welding systems used to make warplanes for the U.S. military during World War II.

1950s 
Sciaky produces its first Electron Beam (EB) welding system in 1957.

1960s 
Sciaky becomes a major supplier of EB welding systems used to make F14 jets in 1969

1970s 
DEC PDP and Data General Nova mini-computer based weld control systems

1980s 
DG Eclipse mini-computer based MarkVII weld control system.

Acquired by Allegheny International in 1982.

Dual VME M68000 based W2000 weld control system.

Acquired by Ferranti International in 1988.

1990s 
Phillips Service Industries, Inc. acquires Sciaky in 1994.

2000s 
Sciaky begins research on a new manufacturing process called Electron Beam Free Form Fabrication (EBFFF) in 2000.

Single VME x86 board W20x0 weld control system

In 2007, Sciaky earns a contract with the National Aeronautics and Space Administration's (NASA) Langley Research Center to create a new EB gun system in the U.S. incorporating the EBFFF system and tested on a microgravity research aircraft and in space. Engineers from NASA assisted in providing supporting hardware to the gun.

In 2009, Sciaky launches its Electron Beam Additive Manufacturing process as a service-only option.

2010s 
In 2011, Sciaky was selected by the Department of Defense (DOD), for the Mentor-Protege Program by Lockheed Martin Aeronautics with the focus of this agreement being the additive manufacturing of titanium structural components for Lockheed Martin's F-35 aircraft program.

In 2012, Sciaky entered a partnership with Penn State University, via DARPA (Defense Advanced Research Projects Agency) funding, to advance Direct Digital Manufacturing technology (DDM) with the goal of advancing and deploying DDM technology for highly engineered and critical metallic systems to the Department of Defense (DOD) and U.S. industry.

In 2014, Sciaky begins selling its EBAM systems on the open market.

As of 2019, the company had four EBAM systems: EBAM 300, 300, 150, and 110.

2020s 
In 2020, Sciaky deposited more than 12,000 lbs. of titanium with its EBAM systems.

Metal 3D printing system 
The company’s EBAM process relies on a wire-based directed energy deposition (DED) process. The systems can print parts from 8 inches to 19 feet long and can deposit up to 25 lbs. of metal per hour. The system can be used with titanium, tantalum, tungsten, Inconel, niobium, copper-nickel, aluminum, molybdenum, zirconium alloy, and stainless steel. Sciaky’s EBAM system uses  closed-loop real-time adaptive controls that self-adjusts the metal deposition.

See also
 List of 3D printer manufacturers

References

Metal companies of the United States
Manufacturing companies based in Chicago
1939 establishments in Illinois
Manufacturing companies established in 1939
3D printer companies
Welding